Sir William Wroughton (1509/10–1559), of Broad Hinton, Wiltshire, was an English politician.

He was a Member (MP) of the Parliament of England for Wiltshire in 1547 and April 1554. He built the present parish church of St. Peter Ad Vincula-Broad Hinton.

He married Eleanor Lewknor, daughter of Edward Lewknor and a seven-time great-granddaughter of King Edward III. Their many descendants include the Wolseley baronets and Garnet Wolseley, 1st Viscount Wolseley.
Their four sons and three daughters included:
Dorothy Wroughton, who married about 1556 Sir John Thynne, had issue, and following his death married Sir Carew Ralegh, older brother of Sir Walter Raleigh, and had issue.
Ann Wroughton, who married Sir Henry Poole of Saperton (d. 1616), Member of Parliament, and had issue.
Sir Thomas Wroughton (died 1597).
Sir James Wroughton.

References

1509 births
1559 deaths
People from Wiltshire
English MPs 1547–1552
English MPs 1554